Richard Ord (born 3 March 1970) is an English former footballer who played as a defender.

Career
Born in Murton, County Durham, Ord joined Sunderland on leaving school in 1986, and played nearly 300 first team games for them until he left the club in 1998. During that time, he helped them win promotion to the top flight twice (1990 and 1996) and achieve runners-up spot in the FA Cup (1992).

Ord attended Easington Comprehensive School. He was a highly rated centre back who could also operate on the left, his most notable achievement being in 1996 when he won the Division One championship with Sunderland.

In the summer of 1998, he signed for Queen's Park Rangers, but was injured in a pre-season friendly. A two-year injury nightmare prevented him from ever playing in a competitive game for QPR, and he finally announced his retirement as a player in 2000, aged only 30.

Ord was manager of non-league Durham City, until 2 October 2012 when he resigned.

In December 2012 Ord released his autobiography, entitled 'Who Needs Cantona When We've Got Dickie Ord!'. The name of the book refers to a popular terrace chant sung by Sunderland fans during his final years at the club, which was then released as a single by a group of supporters.

References

External links

1970 births
Living people
People from Murton, County Durham
Footballers from County Durham
People educated at Easington Community Science College
English footballers
England under-21 international footballers
Association football defenders
Sunderland A.F.C. players
York City F.C. players
Queens Park Rangers F.C. players
Premier League players
English Football League players
English football managers
Durham City A.F.C. managers